The Str8jackets are a London-based trio composed of Mark Robinson, Dave Longmore and Phil Fearon.

The Str8jackets had their first major musical recognition courtesy of BBC Radio 1's Pete Tong who played their bootleg remix of the Black Eyed Peas' "Boom Boom Pow" and their own track "What's It All About?", supported twice on Tong's Essential Selection.

The Str8jackets have worked with producers and artists including Kim English, Hoxton Whores, Bassmonkeys, Lucien Foort, Jaykay, Richie Dan, Ini Kamoze, Katherine Ellis, Inaya Day, Tyree Cooper, MC Chickaboo, and Missy Mak and have released tracks and remixes on labels including Time Records, Big in Ibiza, CR2, Peppermint Jam, and Nervous NYC.

Dave Longmore (a.k.a. Leggz) first made his mark in music working as part of the UK garage production outfit, Ruff N Tumble.

Their release with MC Chickaboo, "Move & Rock" (signed to Big in Ibiza Records) received its first BBC Radio 1 play on 5 July 2010 on Seani B's 1Xtra mixtape show.

References

External links
 Angel-artists.com

English electronic music groups
Musical groups from London
British musical trios